Reza Norouzi (born 21 September 1982) is a retired Iranian footballer.

Club career

Early years
Norouzi started his career with Bargh Shiraz in Iran Pro League.

Steel Azin

Norouzi joined Steel Azin in 2008 after spending the previous year at Bargh Shiraz.

Foolad
He was transferred to Foolad on 2010 and became top goal scorer of 2010–11 season.

Naft Tehran
In October 2012, Norouzi signed with Naft Tehran effective from January 2013. He scored his first goal for Naft in his debut match against Malavan. In his second season with the club he finished the season with 11 goals, one of the most in the league.

Persepolis
After becoming the Pro League's third place with Naft Tehran that was the club's best season in its history, Norouzi had offers from many teams, however, he joined Persepolis in the summer of 2014 and signed a one-year contract until end of 2014–15 season. Persepolis fans nicknamed him as the Blue Killer, because he has scored nine goals against Esteghlal in three previous seasons. He played his first official game for Persepolis against his former team, Naft Tehran on 1 August 2014. He was substituted in 90+2 minutes with Mehdi Taremi.

Club career statistics

 Assist Goals

International career
He started his international career under Afshin Ghotbi in November 2010 against Nigeria. 
He also played for Iran in the 2011 AFC Asian Cup. He was selected in Iran's 30-man provisional squad for the 2014 FIFA World Cup by Carlos Queiroz.

Honours

Individual 
 Iranian Footballer of the Year: 2010
 Iran Pro League Top Goalscorer: 2010–11

References

1982 births
Living people
Bargh Shiraz players
Iranian footballers
Persian Gulf Pro League players
Azadegan League players
Steel Azin F.C. players
Foolad FC players
Naft Tehran F.C. players
Persepolis F.C. players
2011 AFC Asian Cup players
Iran international footballers
Association football forwards
People from Ahvaz
Sportspeople from Khuzestan province